Gennaro Santillo (1 January 1908 – 13 April 1943) was an Italian professional football player. He played for Spezia, Palermo and Grosseto.

A defensive midfielder, Santillo was captain of Palermo during the 1930s and was summoned by Italy national football team coach Vittorio Pozzo on several occasions. He died at Castelvetrano (Sicily) during the Second World War.

References

1908 births
1943 deaths
People from La Spezia
Italian footballers
Association football midfielders
Spezia Calcio players
Palermo F.C. players
F.C. Grosseto S.S.D. players
Serie B players
Serie A players
Footballers from Liguria
Italian military personnel killed in World War II
Sportspeople from the Province of La Spezia